List of Korean films may refer to:

List of Korean films (Pre 1948), a chronology of the films of United Korea before the country division
Lists of South Korean films, a chronology of the films produced in the country of South Korea (post September 1948)
List of North Korean films, a chronology of the films produced in the country of North Korean (post September 1948)
List of highest-grossing films in South Korea, by ticket sales

See also
List of Korean-language films, an A-Z list of film produced in the Korean language